Sinem Barut (born April 12, 1986) is a Turkish volleyball player. She is 186 cm and plays as middle blocker. She plays for Galatasaray.

Awards

Club
 2011-12 Turkish Cup -  Runner-up, with Galatasaray Daikin
 2011-12 CEV Cup -  Runner-up, with Galatasaray Daikin
 2012 Turkish Volleyball Super Cup -  Runner-Up, with Galatasaray Daikin
 2012-2013 Turkish Women's Volleyball Cup -  Bronze Medal with Galatasaray Daikin

See also
 Turkish women in sports

References

1986 births
Living people
Turkish women's volleyball players
Galatasaray S.K. (women's volleyball) players
21st-century Turkish sportswomen